Soliva sessilis, one of up to nine species of the genus Soliva, is a low-growing herbaceous annual plant. Its common names include field burrweed, Onehunga-weed, lawn burrweed, lawnweed, and common soliva. It is one of several plants known as bindi weed, bindii, or bindi-eye.

A weedy plant known for its tiny sharp-needled seeds. It appears with small feathery leaves reminiscent of parsley, with an exposed upward-pointing rosette of seeds in a pod nestled at the branch junctions. Eventually small flowers appear if the plant is allowed to develop. Those familiar with the plant may also know it as "bindi patches", which can't be walked on barefoot. Dogs and cats are no less affected and tend to avoid areas where they have encountered it.

Originally native to South America, the plant is now well established in many places around the world, including Australia, New Zealand, southwest France, Hawaii, California, and several other states in the United States. It is mainly found in parks and ovals, though it has also become an invasive species in lawns in the southeast USA, Australia and New Zealand.

Bindi weed can be manually removed by pulling it out at the root, usually when it's grown big, and started to flower, and before seeding—especially after rain when the ground is softer. A hand tool that pinches the tap root and enables some leverage while getting in under the central core is the best method.

Bindi can be treated with herbicide. Late winter and early spring are the best times to destroy the weed before its seeds germinate. Effective herbicides are typically combinations of MCPA and Dicamba, which target broad-leaved plants but not grasses. These chemicals have similar effects as natural plant auxins, and their increased concentrations cause unnatural plant growth which kill the plant. Mowing grass to a higher level will allow more competitive plants to thrive in the area. Bindi weed also favours compacted ground, so aerating the soil should also reduce the presence of the plant

References

 C.Michael Hogan, ed. 2010. Soliva sessilis, Encyclopedia of Life
Jepson Manual Treatment

External links 

Flora of North America
Washington Burke Museum
Photo gallery

Anthemideae